Gail Anne Riplinger (born October 10, 1947) is an American writer and speaker known for her advocacy of the King James Only movement and denunciation of modern English Bible translations.

Bible comparisons
In 1993, Riplinger wrote a comparison of popular Bible translations to the King James Version, New Age Bible Versions. She also wrote The Language of the King James Bible, Which Bible is God's Word, In Awe of Thy Word, The Hidden History of the English Scriptures, Blind Guides, and Hazardous Materials: Greek and Hebrew Study Dangers.

She has spoken out against the people behind the modern versions of the Bible. She supports the manuscripts used in producing the King James Bible, and criticises the "Alexandrian Texts" manuscripts which are the root texts for most other modern Bibles.

H. Wayne House notes that New Age Bible Versions goes beyond previous King James Only works, in "developing a conspiracy theory for the KJV-only view", and arguing that modern versions are influenced by New Age thought.

One of Riplinger's most criticized actions is her belief that she is doing God's will. House goes on to suggests that Riplinger "claims some sense of divine inspiration for her work". New Age Bible Versions has the author's name "G. A. Riplinger", which stands for "God and Riplinger": "Each discovery was not the result of effort on my part, but of the direct hand of God — so much so that I hesitated to even put my name on the book. Consequently, I used G. A. Riplinger, which signifies to me, God and Riplinger — God as author and Riplinger as secretary." David Cloud calls this statement "amazing and frightful", and says that "even the most radical charismatic prophets hesitate to use such intemperate language".

Critics say that Riplinger has misquoted and misused the works of others. S. E. Schnaiter reviewed her book, New Age Bible Versions, and said, "Riplinger appears to be another of those who rush to [the KJV's] defense, alarmed by the proliferation of its modern rivals, armed with nothing more than the blunderbuss of ad hominem apologetic, when what is needed is the keenness of incisive evaluation." H. Wayne House argues that New Age Bible Versions is "replete with logical, philosophical, theological, biblical, and technical errors".

A lengthy critical review of her book New Age Bible Versions was originally published in Cornerstone in 1994, authored by Bob and Gretchen Passantino of Answers In Action, and described the book as "erroneous, sensationalistic, misrepresentative, inaccurate, and logically indefensible".

They concluded by summarizing "There is hardly a page of this book that is free from error. Riplinger does not know Greek, Hebrew, textual criticism, linguistics, principles of translation, logical argumentation, proper citation and documentation standards, competent English grammar and style, or even consistent spelling. This book would never have done more than use Riplinger's savings and fill up her garage if Christian 'celebrities' such as Texe Marrs and David Hocking had not promoted it."

Jeffrey Straub suggests that Riplinger has "fallen out of favor among many fundamentalists due to her unusual associations, shrill tone, and dubious background".

Works

References

External links
 

1947 births
Living people
American Christian writers
20th-century American non-fiction writers
King James Only movement
21st-century American non-fiction writers
20th-century American women writers
American women non-fiction writers
21st-century American women writers